Harvey Stephen Sayer (born 6 January 2003) is an English professional footballer who plays as a left back for Stowmarket Town on loan from  club Colchester United.

Sayer joined the Norwich City Academy at the age of eight from Bungay Town. He signed for Colchester United in January 2017 and has appeared on loan for Maldon & Tiptree, Billericay Town and Needham Market.

Career
Born in Gorleston-on-Sea, Sayer signed for Colchester United in January 2017, having impressed on trial after appearing against Colchester for Suffolk Schools. He had previously played for Bungay Town from the age of five, but joined the Norwich City Academy at eight years old.

Sayer made two appearances for Maldon & Tiptree during the 2019–20 season. He played in their penalty shoot-out defeat to AFC Sudbury in the Alan Turvey Trophy, and he was a second-half substitute in their 4–0 win against Witham Town in the Essex Senior Cup.

On 29 September 2020, Sayer was named on the Colchester United first-team bench for their EFL Trophy tie against West Ham United under-21s. He came on as a second-half substitute for Miles Welch-Hayes in the 1–0 defeat.

On 11 January 2021, Sayer signed his first professional contract with Colchester, with his new deal keeping him with the club until summer 2023.

Sayer made his English Football League debut on 23 February 2021, coming on as a late substitute for Aramide Oteh during Colchester's 2–1 defeat to Exeter City.

On 21 August 2021, Sayer joined National League South side Billericay Town on loan. He made his debut the same day in their 5–2 defeat to Eastbourne Borough.

Following his Billericay loan, on 21 October 2021 he joined Southern League Premier Division Central side Needham Market on loan.

In February 2023, Sayer joined Stowmarket Town on a one-month loan deal.

International career
Sayer joined up with the England under-15 team for a training camp in February 2018.

Career statistics

References

External links

2003 births
Living people
People from Gorleston-on-Sea
English footballers
Association football fullbacks
Bungay Town F.C. players
Norwich City F.C. players
Colchester United F.C. players
Maldon & Tiptree F.C. players
Billericay Town F.C. players
Needham Market F.C. players
Stowmarket Town F.C. players
English Football League players
National League (English football) players
Southern Football League players
Isthmian League players